George G. Bloomer (born January 23, 1963) is an evangelist, pastor, author, televangelist, speaker and entrepreneur. He is the pastor and founder of Bethel Family Worship Center, a multi-cultural ministry in Durham, North Carolina.  Bloomer is also the founder of G.G. Bloomer Ministries where he travels internationally delivering life-changing messages. George Bloomer's evangelistic and church sermons can be seen on his show, Spiritual Authority on the TCT Network. He was the host of the television program, Rejoice in the Word, which aired on Friday nights on The Word Network until his departure in September 2019.  He now hosts the television show, The Battleground, every Saturday night on TCT Network. As an entrepreneur, he founded Blooming House Publishers, Blooming Records and other for profit businesses.

Ministry

Bethel Family Worship Center
George Bloomer founded Bethel Family Worship Center in 1996, after conducting a 30-day old-fashioned Holy Ghost Crusade in Durham, NC on Liberty Street. The first service began on Sunday morning after the tent revival in the T. Q. Business Complex on Corcoran Street, downtown Durham and later moved their services to 515 Dowd Street in Durham, NC.

C.L.U.R.T. – Come Let Us Reason Together 
C.L.U.R.T. International Assemblies is an organization that provides covering for many independent churches. The founder, Bishop George G. Bloomer, is the presiding Bishop and Overseer. The purpose of CLURT is to prepare God-called men and women for spiritual service in C.L.U.R.T. Assemblies and in other Christian ministries internationally.

Bibliography 
 Warfare Optics, 2017
 Break Loose, 2017
 Witchcraft in the Pews, 1997 
 Elephants in the Church, 2014
 Spiritual Warfare, 2013
 Wisdom Walk, 2012
 Love Dating & Marriage, 2008
 More of Him, 2006
 Looking for Love, 2004
 Authority Abusers, 2002
 When loving you is wrong, 1997
 Empowered from Above, 2002
 Crazy House Sane House, 2001
 The Little Boy in Me, 2000
 The Battle Plan, 2003
 Throw Off What Holds You Back, 2003
 This is War, 2001
 101 Questions Women Ask About Relationships, 1999
 No Suitable Mate, 2004
 Oppressionless, 1998
 Living by the Word, 2005

External links
 G.G. Bloomer Ministries official website
 Bethel Family Worship Center official website

References

1963 births
Living people
American television evangelists
People from Brooklyn
American bishops
American Pentecostal pastors
African-American Christian clergy
American Christian clergy
American Charismatics
Protestant bishops
Pentecostal writers